Hellinsia nauarches is a moth of the family Pterophoridae. It is found in Peru, Argentina and Bolivia.

The wingspan is 27 mm. The forewings are pale ochreous‑brown. The hindwings and fringes are brown‑grey. Adults are on wing in March, June, November and December, at an altitude above 2,750 meters.

References

Moths described in 1930
nauarches
Pterophoridae of South America